is a thirteen episode Japanese anime television series created by Takumi Tsukumo and directed by Hiroshi Negishi, with production by Operation EVE and animation production from Radix Ace Entertainment.

The series is a science fiction story set in the far future, incorporating aspects of space opera. The character-driven storyline focuses primarily on the psychology of the main character, her social interactions, her inhuman abilities, and the conspiracy surrounding them.  The technology is often secondary to this, but it is not ignored; several aspects, including their means of faster-than-light travel, are explained and loosely based on modern physics.

The series was a hit in Japan, which led to the creation of a sequel, Misaki Chronicles, which also ran for 13 episodes.

In North America, the television series was initially licensed by ADV Films and was released in three volumes on VHS and DVD. Sentai Filmworks re-released the series in a box set, including Misaki Chronicles.

Plot
In the year 2017, a satellite on Earth detects a gravitational imbalance in the direction of Lyra, initially believed to be a black hole.  Its suspicious X-ray emissions are subjected to noise removal algorithms, revealing the voice message recorded aboard a fictional future Voyager spacecraft, still in the Solar System.  Before the cause can be determined, additional identical signals are detected throughout the year from other distant gravity-based phenomena.  This is considered proof of faster-than-light travel, and the wormhole responsible is pinpointed to be in the core of Saturn's moon Titan.  By temporarily entering a baby universe still in a state of cosmic inflation, the signal was able to bypass the known laws of physics and travel at infinite speed.  The wormholes themselves became known as Inflation Holes.

Human travel follows almost two centuries later in 2197.  With a tunnel dug into Titan's depths, and a prototype Inflation Drive on board, two astronauts make the first manned faster-than-light voyage, traveling almost three parsecs.  Further exploration of Inflation Holes finds a planet 10 parsecs away with a wormhole core similar to Titan's, formerly inhabited by an extinct alien species.  The planet is in a bizarre "apple core" shape, with all of the equatorial planetary mass consumed by frequent alien use of Inflation Drive technology.  Three giant longitudinal rings surround what is dubbed as the Quantum Core, and ruins exist upon the fragmented Core itself, but electromagnetic radiation inside the Core is severely limited, making exploration slow and difficult.

By 2246, a base has been built on the planet and dubbed Watcher's Nest.  A 12-member expedition is in progress when an unscheduled arrival is detected by command, but the expedition is already inside the Core and radio signals cannot reach them to deliver the recall order.  The expedition team thereby encounters their first Ghoul and are wiped out.  Later encounters also follow.  Autopsies in 2252 by a group called Alchemy reveal artificial genetic modifications, and these genes become the main focus of research into the Ghoul.  When applied to monkeys, the genes expand the scope of the animal's senses, but scientists cannot determine how or why.

After two decades of research, by 2272, one of the lead scientists, Doctor Kessler, is frustrated with the project's slow progress on animals.  Believing the gene sequences to be a message from an advanced alien species, he leads the effort to begin creating genetically modified humans, to witness the effect on humans as the Ghoul intended.  In 2275, Alchemy objects to the use of human guinea pigs, and officially shuts the project down—but not before at least one test subject and one of the only successful Human/Ghoul hybrids is removed by persons unknown.

Characters

Probationary pilots
 
 
 Main character of the series, Misaki is the 18-year-old Japanese daughter of a former officer who served and died on Watcher's Nest. Her klutziness and inability to do anything right is the show's main source of comic relief, and her cheery demeanor is one of its primary means of relaxing the tension.  She joined the army for lack of a better job, and despite her glaring flaws, she was somehow selected as a Seraphim elite cadet.
 At first, Misaki's selection as a cadet seems unlikely or contrived; she seems completely out of place among the other three pilots.  She has far less experience, and while she isn't depicted as stupid or even foolish, she simply has very little innate ability and has trouble acquiring it.  In the subsequent training, she fails miserably where everyone else succeeds.
 This apparent contradiction is quickly resolved, though. It becomes clear that in times of overwhelming fear or pressure, Misaki's latent abilities allow her to succeed where the others fail, including battling the Ghoul head-on. Further, it seems those responsible for selecting and training the pilots knew this all along, and that Misaki is clearly the entire reason they're doing it at all.
 It is eventually revealed that she is a Human/Ghoul hybrid, as her father was one of Alchemy's Ghoul test subjects when he was younger long before he conceived Masaki with her mother. Because of this, Masaki is able to transform into Ghoul-like creature in time when she is in a state of extreme emotion. In this form she is able to battle the Ghoul on much equal(if not superior) footing. This also seems to give Masaki near-godlike time abilities, specifically shown more in the second series.
 
 
 Luxandra's original goal was to be an astronomer.  While working towards this, she found herself caught in a near-deadly encounter when an asteroid struck her passenger ship en route to Jupiter, contaminating it with an unknown virus. She escaped with facial scars, but declined to have them removed as a reminder of her new decision—to become a soldier, one who would put her life on the line to save others, as she herself was saved. She idolizes Lyar in this respect. Frail shows immense prowess in combat and is the only one of the primary characters from Misaki's force group to have formal training before coming to Watcher's Nest; as such she is both competent and level-headed. She is incredibly supportive of Misaki to the point of being somewhat motherly; she clearly understands that she was once an inexperienced rookie herself and sympathizes with her. Sadly during an incident in space Luxandra is eaten alive by a ghoul.
 
 
 As the daughter of a British family with a long history in the military, Suzanna was expected to hold up that tradition. For a time, she did:  At age 18, she finds herself aboard Watcher's Nest as another of the four pilot candidates. As training and tests continue, her skills make her the primary replacement candidate. However, when first put to the test to determine her compatibility with the Integral System sensor and control interface, she panics and fails. Although not a permanent setback, it prompts her to reconsider her career, and she finally decides to pursue her true calling in engineering rather than the military. Several years of her memory are wiped, and she leaves the series with no recollection of the others. Suzanna reappears later in the series with no memory of the others; she works as a maintenance technician in the civilian wards of Watchers' Nest.
 
 
 Not much is currently known about Kiri except that she is an 18-year-old New Zealander with martial arts training. She joined Seraphim in order to become strong and protect the weak. Of the four candidates, she appears the steadiest and has the strongest sense of humor.

Crew
 
 
 A gifted commander and pilot from Germany, Ertiana's goal is to be married by age 30, despite already being 29 and having no current prospects.  She was placed in charge of Seraphim and supervises the new cadets, but unofficial word is that she is to be promoted to Lieutenant Commander and transferred out to command headquarters so that her experience may be put to better use. Hence, the four cadets are reportedly being sent in as candidates to replace her, and trained to that effect. Lyar is eventually promoted in Tragedy of Cherubim, but she has so far continued to serve on Watcher's Nest. Lyar despises LeBlanc, continually suspicious that the head of Alchemy knows far more about the extra-temporal monsters known as the Ghoul than he lets on.
 
 
 Commander of Watcher's Nest, German officer Woerns is rarely seen without a serious scowl. Given the limited success in containing the Ghoul so far, he is charged with the difficult and thankless duty of simply holding out as long as he can. At age 50, there are rumors that he's considering Ertiana to replace him, despite threatening her with discipline when she has trouble containing Misaki's nervous breakdown.
 
 
 Known to Bernard as Professor Je Labelle, this high-ranking French member of Alchemy remains a mysterious character. Even Prim does not always understand his decisions. He's the driving force behind the scenes of the revived Kessler Project, and considers himself immune to interference—only Woerns outranks him, and the Commander has many problems and few options. An air of conspiracy follows him, in part because he is typically smiling to himself when misfortune strikes. The only event to visibly catch him off-guard was when the Ghoul appeared unexpectedly in episode five ("Seraphim"), revealing itself to the enemy spy Bernard.
 
 
 Prim is a scientist aboard Watcher's Nest and an accomplice to LeBlanc. Her duties include overseeing the Rampart Armors and Integral Systems, repairing Kotoko, monitoring the physical and mental data of the cadets, analyzing data for LeBlanc, and keeping watch on their test subject, Misaki.  She follows LeBlanc unquestioningly, but not always happily, expressing secret concern and sorrow for Misaki.  Even when she breaks schedule to give all four cadets a day off to recover, her concern seems to be primarily for Misaki. It is revealed later in the series that Prim was the product of genetic engineering, and as such she sees Misaki as a kindred spirit.
 
 
 The Kotoko-series support android by the same name is nearly always by Lyar's side, both literally and figuratively. Appearing as a ten-year-old girl, she fits the role with her childlike excitement, but is nevertheless shown to be extremely capable of both flying her R.A. and handling a minigun. Even if her body is completely destroyed (as seen in episode 1), she can't truly die since her mind and data are linked to and backed up in Lyar's computer systems which she updates routinely to protect and preserve Kotoko's memories. Her main fault is that her loyalty only extends as far as her programming, a weakness exploited by Bernard when he reprogrammed Kotoko to shoot anyone attempting to pursue him and Misaki. She and Lyar seem to have a sort of older sister/younger sister relationship, and Lyar is often the one who updates Kotoko's programming when the need arises. In terms of fanservice, Kotoko serves to fill the lolicon niche of the series.
 
 
 Sergeant Walker is the American instructor sent to train the four cadets. He accompanies them to Watcher's Nest, continuing their training under the watch and direction of Lyar. Strict but fair, he is ready to drive the cadets well beyond their tolerance if it makes them tougher the next time.  He does not consider himself a babysitter, though, and later refuses to train the unmotivated Misaki until she recovers on her own.
 
 The nurse with the pink uniform, seen after Suzanna's memory wiping.
 
 
 The orange-haired technician, seen giving Luxandra her injection.

Others

Posing as an official reporter for "News of the Galaxy", Bernard arrives in episode five (Seraphim) to spy on Alchemy. He claims his father died with Misaki's in the Tragedy of Cherubim, yet doesn't point him out when showing Misaki the list of those who died. After realizing who and what Misaki is, his duty is to make contact and keep watch on her, and his bonding with her is likely just a means to that end. He incites her to help him steal a craft and download the data from the site of the Tragedy, while LeBlanc surveils him passively. Once Bernard knows too much, LeBlanc shoots him and seizes the useful data, as planned all along.

Very little is known about the Ghoul; they are an extra-dimensional (and likely extra-temporal) monster from an alternate universe. They are from a realm inimical to humanity and seem to despise other forms of life, attacking viciously whenever and wherever encountered. They have been seen brutally killing humans (and occasionally eating them, as seen in Episode 10), but they are also known to alter the corpses of those they kill genetically - infecting them with Ghoul tissue and leaving them as animate, timelost undead horrors known as Necromancers.
The Ghoul emerge from the Alternate universe every once and again when Watchers' Nest Inflation Hole is engaged; they appear to emerge from another time as well as another place. The Ghoul, as an extra-temporal, exists in a transient sense, and thus most attacks on the creature have only a small chance to actually affect it since it may not actually exist when a weapon hits them. This renders the Ghoul almost impervious to conventional attack and also means most physical barriers and even body armor are meaningless to the Ghoul, since they can merely phase through a wall or armor. They can also generate weapons-grade energy blasts and their mere presence causes massive electromagnetic disturbances.
The Ghoul, however, have 2 major weaknesses. For one, they can be isolated and forced back to their own timestream using the Quantum Barrier on Watcher's Nest; this instantly sends the Ghoul back to its original realm and proves the most effective means of elimination - however, it is also temporary. The second means involves using advanced technology to guide weaponry to the ideal point when and where a Ghoul will manifest and eliminating it using conventional firepower, via the Integral System. Whilst infinitely harder, success will outright kill a Ghoul and prevent it from returning.
Because the Ghoul are extra-temporal entities, even being in a location that is within a few minutes of where a Ghoul appears can be dangerous. These effects, which occur before and after a Ghoul attack, are known as Specular images. They are disrupted via Quantum Barrier technology; if a Ghoul is eliminated or repulsed, its Specular image ceases to be a threat as well.
The Ghoul seem both fascinated with and terrified of Misaki; when encountering her, the Ghoul often react as if she is a kindred creature and do not harm her - even when she is outright hostile it seems difficult for the Ghoul to move itself to take action against Misaki, because she's a ghoul herself. There have been instances where they have attacked Misaki, but that only happens once the ghouls realize she is a threat to their lives. An example is in the first episode where a ghoul struggling to get free from her grip impales the transformed Misaki with its scorpion-like tail.
In Misaki Chronicles, Seraphim's anti-ghoul technology has grown by leaps and bounds despite there being only a few short days between the two series. Man-portable weapons capable of generating short-lived quantum barriers that are capable of containing the Ghoul for a short time exist, along with energy weapons better-suited for dealing with Ghoul attacks. This enables Eritiana to deal with Ghoul Specular images, and suppress a Ghoul long enough for precision repulsion or elimination with assistance from Rampart Armor units.
Others
Morozov 
Juuzou Kureha 
Kessler 
Lieutenant Azevedo 
Nodera

Episodes
Divergence Eve takes place on Watcher's Nest, now effectively a giant space station built inside the planet halves with a population of ten million. The first episode is actually set between episodes 12 and 13, but is played first with no explanation in order to build viewer curiosity and provide strong foreshadowing.

Notes

References

Divergence EVE: Welcome to Watcher's Nest.  Story by Takumi Tsukumo, directed by Hiroshi Negishi, produced by Operation EVE.  DVD.  ADV Films, 2003.
Divergence EVE: Core Mission.  Story by Takumi Tsukumo, directed by Hiroshi Negishi, produced by Operation EVE.  DVD.  ADV Films, 2003.

Further reading

External links
Radix page
Media Factory page
ADV Films page
Sentai Filmworks page: DE
Official Tokyo MX website 

2003 anime television series debuts
2003 Japanese television series debuts
2003 Japanese television series endings
ADV Films
Adventure anime and manga
Anime with original screenplays
AT-X (TV network) original programming
Hal Film Maker
Horror anime and manga
MF Bunko J
Science fiction anime and manga
Sentai Filmworks